Sunset is an unincorporated community in Montague County, Texas, United States. Until 1900, a surveying error had placed the community in Wise County. The Fort Worth and Denver Railway runs through Sunset. The population was 339 at the 2000 census. The city disincorporated on April 19, 2007.

History

2009 wildfires
On April 9, 2009, the community was evacuated in advance of approaching wildfires. The fires ripped through the town in "patchwork fashion", destroying many homes and businesses.

Geography
Sunset is located at  (33.453823, -97.766724).

Demographics

As of the census of 2000, Sunset had 339 people, 133 households, and 90 families with a population density of 318.8 people per square mile (123.5/km). Additionally, Sunset had 151 housing units at an average density of 142.0 per square mile (55.0/km). The racial makeup was 95.28% White, 1.18% Asian, 1.47% from other races, and 2.06% from two or more races. Hispanics or Latinos of any race were 3.24% of the population.

Of the 133 households noted in the 2000 census, 36.1% had children under the age of 18, 54.1% were married couples living together, 8.3% had a female householder with no husband present, and 31.6% were not families. About 28.6% of all households were made up of individuals, and 14.3% had someone living alone who was 65 years of age or older. The average household size was 2.55 and the average family size was 3.15.

Per the 2000 census, the population of Sunset was distributed as 18 or younger (28.6%), 18-24 (7.7%), 25-44 (28.9%), 45-64 (22.1%), and 65 or older (12.7%). The median age was 35 years.

The median income at the 2000 census was $24,886 for households and $29,643 for families. Males had a median income of $26,875 versus $17,083 for females. The per capita income for the city was $11,304. About 17.3% of families and 16.5% of the population were below the poverty line, including 26.4% of those under the age of 18 and 4.2% of those 65 or over.

Education
Sunset is served by the Bowie Independent School District.

References

External links

Unincorporated communities in Montague County, Texas
Unincorporated communities in Texas
Populated places disestablished in 2007
Former cities in Texas
Census-designated places in Montague County, Texas